Harry Orliff Downey (May 9, 1897 – April 17, 1974) was a fox rancher and political figure in the Province of New Brunswick, Canada. He represented Albert in the Legislative Assembly of New Brunswick from 1931 to 1952 as a Liberal member.

He was born in Curryville, New Brunswick, the son of Oscar E. Downey and Rose E. Matthews. Downey was speaker for the provincial assembly from 1944 to 1952.

References 
 Canadian Parliamentary Guide, 1948, PG Normandin

http://www.gnb.ca/legis/speakers/bios/downey-harry-e.asp

1897 births
1974 deaths
New Brunswick Liberal Association MLAs
Speakers of the Legislative Assembly of New Brunswick
People from Albert County, New Brunswick